Polypoetes bifenestra is a moth of the family Notodontidae. It is found in cloud forests in the Oriente of northern Ecuador at elevations between 2,000 and 3,000 meters.

The length of the forewings is 10.5–13 mm for males and 13-13.5 mm for females. The ground color of the forewings and hindwings is dark charcoal gray, almost black.

Etymology
The species name is derived from Latin, bi (meaning two) and fenestra (meaning window) and refers to the hyaline, windowlike fasciae in both the forewings and hindwings.

References

Moths described in 2008
Notodontidae of South America